The aperture of an optical system is the opening that limits the amount of light that can pass through.

Aperture may also refer to:

Science and technology
In anatomy, a number of apertures in the human body:
Apertura nasalis posterior
Apertura pelvis inferior
Apertura pelvis minoris
Apertura pelvis superior
Apertura thoracis inferior
Apertura thoracis superior
Lateral aperture (foramen of Luschka), an opening in each lateral extremity of the lateral recess of the fourth ventricle of the human brain
Median aperture (foramen of Magendie), which drains cerebrospinal fluid (CSF) from the fourth ventricle into the cisterna magna
Antenna aperture, a physical parameter of an antenna
Aperture (mollusc), the main opening in the shell of a gastropod or scaphopod (mollusc)
Aperture (botany), a weaker spot in the wall of a pollen grain
Numerical aperture is a parameter used to describe optical systems
Aperture (computer memory), a region of the physical address space that opens access to a particular device or memory unit
Aperture (software), an image organization and editing program for photographers, sold by Apple Inc.

Other uses
Aperture (magazine), a long-running art photography magazine
"Aperture" (song), a song by Emily Blue
Aperture (typography), an enclosed loop in a typographical symbol, such as the lower part of the letter 'a'
Aperture Foundation, a photography nonprofit
Aperture Science, a fictional organization featured in the Portal video game series

See also
 Aputure, a lighting company